Portis may refer to:

People
 Alan M. Portis (1926–2010), American physicist
 Ben Portis (1960–2017), Canadian artist
 Bobby Portis (born 1995), American basketball player
 Charles Portis (1933–2020), American author
 Clinton Portis (born 1981), American football player
 Josh Portis (born 1987), American football player
 Larry Portis (1943–2011), American historian

Other uses
 Portis, Kansas, United States
 PORTIS/SPORTIS (Portable Ticket Issuing System), a ticketing system introduced by British Rail

See also
 Portishead (disambiguation)